Jacob Stuart Aydelott (July 6, 1861 – October 22, 1926) was a professional baseball pitcher. He played parts of two seasons in Major League Baseball, 1884 for the Indianapolis Hoosiers and 1886 for the Philadelphia Athletics.

Sources

Major League Baseball pitchers
Indianapolis Hoosiers (AA) players
Philadelphia Athletics (AA) players
Baseball players from Indiana
People from North Manchester, Indiana
19th-century baseball players
1861 births
1926 deaths
Minor league baseball managers